Wood pigeon, wood-pigeon or woodpigeon may refer to:

Birds
 Common wood pigeon, endemic to Europe and western Asia
 Columba (bird), any "Old World" pigeon
 Andaman wood pigeon (C. palumboides) of India's Andaman and Nicobar Islands
 Ashy wood pigeon (C. pulchricollis) of South and Southeast Asia
 Japanese wood pigeon (C. janthina) of East Asia
 Nilgiri wood pigeon (C. elphinstonii) of southwestern India
 Pale-capped pigeon (C. punicea) of South and Southeast Asia
 Sri Lanka wood pigeon (C. torringtoniae)
 Speckled wood pigeon (C. hodgsonii) of subtropical Asia
 Other pigeon species:
 Kererū (Hemiphaga novaeseelandiae) of New Zealand
 Wood doves (Turtur) of sub-Saharan Africa

Arts and entertainment
 Wood Pigeon (film), a 1970 Iranian drama film
 Woodpigeon (band), a Canadian indie-pop collective